Events in the year 1921 in Brazil.

Incumbents

Federal government 
 President: Epitácio Pessoa 
 Vice President: Francisco Álvaro Bueno de Paiva

Governors 
 Alagoas: 
 till 1 March: José Fernandes de Barros Lima 
 1 March-12 June: Manuel Capitolino da Rocha Carvalho
 from 12 June: José Fernandes de Barros Lima
 Amazonas: César do Rego Monteiro
 Bahia: José Joaquim Seabra
 Ceará: Justiniano de Serpa
 Goiás:
 till 14 July: João Alves de Castro
 from 14 July: Eugênio Rodrigues Jardim
 Maranhão: Urbano Santos
 Mato Grosso: Francisco de Aquino Correia
 Minas Gerais: Artur Bernardes
 Pará: 
 till 1 February: Lauro Sodré
 from 1 February Antônio Emiliano de Sousa
 Paraíba: Sólon Barbosa de Lucena
 Paraná: Caetano Munhoz da Rocha
 Pernambuco:
 till 3 June: Otávio Hamilton Tavares Barreto
 from 3 June: Severino Marques de Queirós Pinheiro
 Piauí: João Luís Ferreira
 Rio Grande do Norte: Antonio José de Melo e Sousa
 Rio Grande do Sul: Antônio Augusto Borges de Medeiros
 Santa Catarina:
 São Paulo: 
 Sergipe:

Vice governors 
 Rio Grande do Norte:
 São Paulo:

Events 
February – Antoun Saadeh arrives in Brazil with his father, a prominent Arabic-language journalist.
May 22 – The Estádio Antônio R. Guimarães is opened at Santa Bárbara d'Oeste.
October - The government implements a new policy in defense of coffee, for the third time in the history of the Republic.
date unknown – The Correio da Manhã publishes letters supposedly sent by Artur Bernardes and Raul Soares de Moura, containing insults towards the Armed Forces and Marshal Hermes da Fonseca.

Arts and culture

Films
Um Crime no Parque Paulista, directed by Arturo Carrari and starring Nicola Tartaglione
Carlitinhos and Perversidade, short films directed by José Medina

Births 
13 April – Dona Ivone Lara, singer (died 2018)
12 May – Ruth de Souza, actress (died 2019)
5 June – Zuzu Angel, fashion designer and political campaigner (died 1976)
19 September – Paulo Freire, philosopher (died 1997)
26 September - Carlos Zéfiro, artist (died 1992)

Deaths 
28 January – Luis Soares Horta Barbosa, Deputy Grand Master of Brazil's Freemasons.
26 March – Leonel Martiniano de Alencar, Baron of Alencar, lawyer and diplomat (born 1832)
14 November – Isabel, Princess Imperial of Brazil, nicknamed "the Redemptress", heiress presumptive to the throne of the Empire of Brazil (born 1846)

References

See also 
1921 in Brazilian football

 
1920s in Brazil
Years of the 20th century in Brazil
Brazil
Brazil